Jason Tran, better known as WildTurtle, is a Canadian professional League of Legends player who is the bot laner for Team SoloMid of the LCS. He previously played for Cloud9, CLG, Immortals, and FlyQuest. WildTurtle played in the 2013, 2014, 2015, and 2020 World Championships.

Early life
WildTurtle used to play Defense of the Ancients, but transitioned to League of Legends to play with his friends. He returned to the game at the end of 9th grade after a one-year hiatus.

Career
During Season 1 of League of Legends (2010-2011), WildTurtle played for Forty Bus Gaming and Kill Steal Gaming. He played for Monomaniac eSports prior to IPL (IGN Pro League) Season 4. He left the team around 2 weeks before the tournament due to internet access issues which prevented him from practicing enough.

2012
Wildturtle was a substitute for Team Legion at the IPL Face Off: San Francisco Showdown on August 11 and 12 and played against Team WE. Later in the month, he played for Counter Logic Gaming Black at the MLG (Major League Gaming) Summer Championship, replacing Austin "LiNk" Shin as their mid-laner. They lost 0–2 to Team Dignitas in the second round of the tournament.

On October 20 Orbit Gaming announced that they were replacing their Attack Damage Carry (ADC) Nientohsoh with WildTurtle. Nientohsoh would move to the mid position, replacing nubbypoohbear who had left the team. The team left the organization on November 1, stating that some prize money was stolen and that equipment was never given to them. They renamed to Reddit Nation, and attended the Lone Star Clash 2 event. After the tournament Quantic Gaming announced that they had acquired the team.

On December 4, Quantic Gaming disbanded. Sources stated that investors withdrew funding without notifying the organization. The team was released on December 12 and renamed to the placeholder name NomNom. They finished in the top three at the Season 3 North American MLG Online Qualifiers and secured a spot to the offline qualifier for the League of Legends Championship Series (LCS).

2013
NomNom renamed to Cloud9 on January 8. They did not pass the offline qualifier for the LCS.

In March, the ADC of Team SoloMid (TSM), Chaox, was benched, then removed from the organization as a result of his lackluster performance, extracurricular activities, and attitude. WildTurtle, a substitute for TSM since February, became their starting ADC after initially substituting for Chaox when he was benched. Cloud9 replaced WildTurtle with SnEaKyCaStRoO.

TSM took first place in the North American League of Legends Championship Series (NA LCS) Spring Split. They lost 0–3 to Cloud9 in the finals of the NA LCS Summer Split playoffs.

2014
At the NA LCS Summer Split playoffs, TSM defeated Cloud9 in the finals 3–2, claiming first place.

TSM lost 1–3 to Samsung White in the quarterfinals of the 2014 World Championship in October.

In December, TSM lost 0–2 to Unicorns of Love in the quarterfinals of the Intel Extreme Masters Season (IEM) IX San Jose tournament.

2015
At the IEM Season IX – World Championship in March, TSM defeated Team WE 3–0 in the finals to win the tournament.

In April, TSM claimed first place at the NA LCS Spring Split playoffs after defeating Cloud9 3–1.

The team was eliminated from the Mid-Season Invitational in May in the group stage.

In August, TSM lost 0–3 to Counter Logic Gaming (CLG) in the finals of the NA LCS Summer Split playoffs.

TSM was eliminated from the 2015 World Championship in the group stage.

On December 7 Immortals announced that they had acquired WildTurtle.

2016
Immortals finished first in the NA LCS Spring Split regular season while having the best split in NA LCS history, with a 17–1 record.

Immortals lost 0–3 to TSM in the semifinals of the NA LCS Spring Split playoffs in April, then beat Team Liquid 3–0 in the third place match. Finishing second in the NA LCS Summer Split regular season, they lost 2–3 to Cloud9 in the semifinals, beating CLG 3–2 in the third-place match. Ending the season with the most championship points, they were seeded into the top of the regional qualifiers for the 2016 League of Legends World Championship, but were defeated by Cloud9 1–3, failing to qualify for the tournament.

In early November, WildTurtle was negotiating with Team Dignitas, and played as a substitute for TSM at IEM XI Oakland, where the team lost to Unicorns of Love in the semifinals. He then signed with the team on December 7, dropping negotiations with Dignitas and replacing Doublelift, who was taking a break from his pro-gaming career during the 2017 NA LCS Spring Split. He was replaced on Immortals by Cody Sun.

Tournament results

Team SoloMid
 1st - Season 3 NA LCS Summer
 2nd - Season 3 NA LCS Spring
 2nd - 2014 NA LCS Spring Playoffs 
 1st - 2014 NA LCS Summer Playoffs 
 1st - IEM IX World Championship - Katowice

Immortals
 1st - 2016 NA LCS Spring Split Round Robin
 3rd - 2016 NA LCS Spring Playoffs
 2nd — 2016 NA LCS Summer regular season
 3rd — 2016 NA LCS Summer playoffs

References

Living people
Canadian esports players
Immortals (esports) players
Team SoloMid players
Cloud9 (esports) players
Canadian expatriates in the United States
Sportspeople from Toronto
Sportspeople from Los Angeles
Canadian people of Vietnamese descent
Counter Logic Gaming players
League of Legends AD Carry players
Year of birth missing (living people)